Senyah is an album recorded by American drummer Roy Haynes in 1972 for the Mainstream label.

Reception 

AllMusic awarded the album 4 stars and its review by Ron Wynn states "This set is a burner, featuring Haynes in an entirely new light".

Track listing
All compositions by Roy Haynes except as indicated
 "Sillie Willie" (George Adams) – 7:48
 "Little Titan"  (Marvin Peterson) – 7:22
 "Senyah" (Joe Bonner) – 5:30
 "Full Moon" (Adams) – 6:14
 "Brujeria con Salsa" – 4:01

Personnel 
 Roy Haynes – drums, timpani
 Marvin Peterson – trumpet
 George Adams – tenor saxophone
 Carl Schroeder – piano
 Roland Prince – guitar
 Don Pate – bass
 Lawrence Killian – congas

References 

1972 albums
Roy Haynes albums
Mainstream Records albums
Albums produced by Bob Shad